Muttanisseril Koyakutty Maulavi (14 August 1926 – 27 May 2013) was an Islamic scholar, orator and author who comes from the southern state of Kerala in India. His works in the scientific interpretation of the Quran, its translation into the local language (Malayalam), and authoring of various articles related to Islam and its studies have been published in various mediums and are very well received. He was awarded the Kerala Sahithya Akademi Literary award for translating the Quran in 1967 . He died on 27 May 2013.

Books in English
He has authored twenty five books, published in Malayalam and English, including the Malayalam Translation of the Quran and Ibn Qaldun's Muqaddima.
Fact or Fallacy
Science enshrined in the glorious Quran
Science Behind The Miracle
The Challenge
Method In The Quran – 1987
Theory Of Evolution And The Quran
Essays : Thoughts On The Quran : Eighty Essays Published In The Oman Observer (2000 – 2003)
Washington speeches : Twenty lectures delivered in Islamic centre, Maryland, U.S.A., ready for  Publication, October 2003.

Picture Gallery

References

1926 births
20th-century Muslim scholars of Islam
2013 deaths
Indian scholars